The Murray Falls, a cascade waterfall on the Murray River, is located in the UNESCO World Heritagelisted Wet Tropics in Murray Upper, Cassowary Coast Region in the Far North region of Queensland, Australia.

Location and features
A short walking track through the rainforest leads to a lookout, where the falls and the Murray Valley can be viewed. In the year ended 2012, the falls received an estimated  visitors.

In 2003, a man died in hospital after falling at the falls.

Other waterfalls in the Cardwell district include Wallaman Falls, Blencoe Falls and Attie Creek Falls.

The Murray River and its associated Murray Falls are named after the British colonial Native Police officer John Murray.

See also

 List of waterfalls of Queensland

References

External links

  

Waterfalls of Far North Queensland
Cascade waterfalls